Miss Universe 1975, the 24th Miss Universe pageant, was held on 19 July 1975 at the National Gymnasium in San Salvador, El Salvador. Anne Marie Pohtamo won the title for Finland, thus making her the second Finnish woman to win the Miss Universe crown after Armi Kuusela, who was the first Miss Universe winner, in 1952. After Spain's Amparo Muñoz resigned the previous year, her successor was crowned by Miss Universe 1972, Kerry Anne Wells of Australia.

The political backdrop to the 1975 Miss Universe pageant was not a happy one, however. According to the New York Times, August 5, "while a worldwide television audience saw El Salvador’s sunny beaches before the “Miss Universe” finals July 19, off-camera heavily armed troops were called out to halt demonstrations by students protesting the Government's expenditure of $1-million on the contest". Protests took place in Santa Ana and San Salvador. Again, from the NY Times: "According to the military Government, which contended that the march was part of a “Communist plot”, one person was killed, five wounded, and 11 arrested. But according to the students, at least 12 persons were killed, 20 wounded, and 40 arrested".

This year also marked the first time in the history that all five American territories had been competing together in the Miss Universe pageant along with Miss USA. However, Northern Mariana Islands competed as the geographical region of Micronesia instead of the individual territory itself, but just then, the territory began competing as Miss Northern Marianas a year later.

Results

Placements

Contestants

Notes

Debuts

Returns
Last competed in 1961:
 
Last competed in 1966:
 
Last competed in 1968:
 
 
Last competed in 1972:
 
 
Last competed in 1973:

Withdrawals

Did not compete
  — Dorothy Lamore McKoy
  — Eloise Jubienne
  — Sissel Gulbrandsen
  Swaziland — Vinah Thembi Mamba

Replacements
  — Sirikwan Nantasiri, Miss Thailand Universe 1975 (not to be confused with Miss Universe Thailand), refused to compete in order to achieve acting career. The pageant authorities decided to send Wanlaya Thonawanik, her 3rd runner-up to compete instead.

Awards
  — Miss Amity (Christine Mary Jackson)
  — Miss Photogenic (Martha Echeverry)
  — Miss Photogenic (Summer Bartholomew)
  — Best National Costume (Emy Elivia Abascal)

General References

References

1975
1975 beauty pageants
1975 in El Salvador
Beauty pageants in El Salvador
July 1975 events in North America